Mühlheim may refer to several places in Germany and Austria:

Mühlheim am Main, in Hesse, Germany
Mühlheim an der Donau, in Baden-Württemberg, Germany
Mühlheim am Inn, in Upper Austria, Austria

See also
Mülheim an der Ruhr, North Rhine-Westphalia, Germany
Mülheim an der Mosel, in the Rhineland-Palatinate, Germany
Mülheim, Cologne, a city district of Cologne, Germany
Müllheim, in Baden-Württemberg, Germany
Müllheim, Switzerland, the Canton of Thurgau, Switzerland